The Complete Idiot's Guides is a product line of how-to and other reference books published by Dorling Kindersley (DK). The books in this series provide a basic understanding of a complex and popular topics. The term "idiot" is used as hyperbole, to reassure readers that the guides will be basic and comprehensible, even if the topics seem intimidating. The approach relies on explaining a topic step-by-step, using basic terminology, definitions of words, and profiles of people.  

Alpha Books, publisher of the Complete Idiot's Guides, is a member of Penguin Group. It began as a division of Macmillan. Pearson Education acquired Macmillan General Reference from Simon & Schuster in 1999. Alpha moved from Pearson Education to Penguin Group in 2003. Alpha became part of sister company DK in 2012.

The line parallels the For Dummies books.  The editorial offices for the two competing series are both located partially in Indianapolis.

See also 

 For Dummies – a similar series of how-to books from John Wiley & Sons, Inc.
 Découvertes Gallimard, a similar series in French of introductory books, noted for its fine illustration. Some titles are translated in other languages.
 FabJob – a similar series of how-to-books for starting a business or dream career
 Teach Yourself – another similar series published by Hodder Headline
 Very Short Introductions, a similar series of introductory books published by the Oxford University Press.

References

External links 
The Complete Idiot's Guides website

Handbooks and manuals
Series of books
Study guides